IVF-Worldwide is an in-vitro fertilization (IVF) focused educational online website. At present, it is the largest directory of IVF clinics on the web. The website was founded by Prof. Milton Ka Hong Leong specialists in the field of infertility.

IVF-Worldwide provides a variety of informative material about IFV, such as recent publications and abstracts, presentations, videos and newsletters. The website conducts large-scale online surveys among IVF Units with the goal of advancing research. IVF-Worldwide is the main supporter of the Journal of Fertilization: In Vitro - IVF-Worldwide, Reproductive Medicine, Genetics & Stem Cell Biology.

Content on the website is reviewed by the IVF-Worldwide Advisory Board to promise that the content is unbiased, reliable and meets academic standards. Though it is an academic website mainly addressing specialists in IVF, the website also has a section for patients that includes information and community forums.

History
The website was founded in 2008 by Prof. Milton Ka Hong Leong. Originally the website started out as a global directory of IVF clinics worldwide. Following the launch of the website, 3,600 IVF Units from different countries registered on the site. This allowed users to find IVF services anywhere. Today, the website maps most of the IVF Units in the world.

In 2009 the founders decided to expand the website by adding educational content. They began posting academic material on the website, and its members began receiving a bi-monthly newsletter.

In 2010 the IVF-Worldwide began conducting large-scale surveys on key topics of interest in the field of IVF. In 2011 the website expanded to include discussion forums between physicians and a blog. Since 2013 the website supports the Journal of Fertilization: In Vitro - IVF-Worldwide, Reproductive Medicine, Genetics & Stem Cell Biology.

Founders
Prof. Milton Ka Hong Leong lives in Hong Kong.  He graduated from McGill University Medical School in Montreal, Canada. Prof. Leong taught at McGill University and was head of the High-Risk Obstetric Unit. In 1979 he returned to Hong Kong and set up the IVF Centre at the Hong Kong Sanatorium and Hospital.

Prof. Leong “made” and delivered the first IVF baby in Hong Kong in 1985, and in the last 20 years had researched, published, and taught the art and science of infertility and the assisted reproductive techniques.

Prof. Leong is a member of various reproductive medicine societies and various international committees. He lectures widely, still plays an active academic role, and remains to be an Adjunct Professor of Obstetrics and Gynecology at McGill University.

See also
 In vitro fertilisation

References

External links
Official website

Medical websites